Sir Richard Hankford (c. 1397–1431) was holder by right of his wife (jure uxoris) of the feudal barony of Bampton and part of the feudal barony of Barnstaple in Devon, England.

Biography
He was the son of Richard Hankford (died 1419), MP for Devon in 1414 and 1416, the son of Sir William Hankford ( – 1423) KB, of Annery in Devon, Chief Justice of the King's Bench. On the death of his grandfather in 1423 he became his heir because his father had pre-deceased him (in 1419). The Hankford family had been long established at the estate of Hankford, from which they took their name, near Bulkworthy in the parish of Buckland Brewer, North Devon.

Hankford served in France during the Hundred Years' War in the retinue of his brother-in-law Thomas Montacute, 4th Earl of Salisbury (c. 1388–1428), and was knighted at St Albans between 8 July and 6 October 1429, aged about 32. He died in 1431 at the age of about 34.

Marriages and children
Hankford married twice. Firstly at some time before 1420 he married Elizabeth FitzWarin (1403–1426/8) (or "FitzWarren"), daughter of Fulk FitzWarin, 6th Baron FitzWarin (1389–1407) and sole heiress of her brother Fulk FitzWarin, 7th Baron FitzWarin (1406–1420), feudal baron of Bampton and holder of part of the feudal barony of Barnstaple, including that barony's seat of Tawstock. By Elizabeth FitzWarin he had two daughters and co-heiresses. The eldest was Thomasine (1422/3–1453) who inherited from her mother Bampton and Tawstock and many other manors and married William Bourchier, 9th Baron FitzWarin (1407–1470). The younger daughter, Elizabeth, died young in 1433.

Hankford's second wife was Anne de Montagu (died 1457), a daughter of John de Montagu, 3rd Earl of Salisbury (c.1350–1400). She survived him and remarried twice. On her death she was buried with her third husband (John Holland, 2nd Duke of Exeter) in the church of St Katharine by the Tower in the City of London.  Hankford had a daughter by Anne, Anne Hankford (c. 1431–1485), who inherited Annery from her father. She married the extremely wealthy Thomas Butler, 7th Earl of Ormond (died 1515).

References

Sources

Prince, John, The Worthies of Devon. A new edition, with notes.  London, 1810.

People from Torridge District
1397 births
1431 deaths
Medieval English knights